Penubalakala (Pencity) is a developing village in Chittoor, Andhra Pradesh, in a panchayat which includes 13 small villages.

References

Villages in Chittoor district